Vontarrius Dora (born September 7, 1992) is an American football outside linebacker for the Winnipeg Blue Bombers of the Canadian Football League (CFL). He played college football at Louisiana Tech and was signed by the Denver Broncos as an undrafted free agent in 2016.

Professional career

Denver Broncos
Dora was signed by the Denver Broncos as an undrafted free agent on May 2, 2016. He was released on September 3, 2016 and was signed to the practice squad the next day. He was promoted to the active roster on December 16, 2016.

On September 2, 2017, Dora was waived by the Broncos.

Arizona Cardinals
On October 4, 2017, Dora was signed to the Arizona Cardinals' practice squad. He was released on October 16, 2017.

Indianapolis Colts
On October 31, 2017, Dora was signed to the Indianapolis Colts' practice squad. He was released on November 14, 2017.

Arizona Cardinals (second stint)
On December 19, 2017, Dora was signed to the Arizona Cardinals' practice squad. He signed a reserve/future contract with the Cardinals on January 2, 2018.

On September 2, 2018, Dora was waived by the Cardinals. He was re-signed to the practice squad on October 30, 2018. He was promoted to the active roster on November 17, 2018, but was waived three days later and re-signed back to the practice squad. On December 4, 2018, Dora was promoted to the active roster after Olsen Pierre was placed on injured reserve.

On August 31, 2019, Dora was waived by the Cardinals and was signed to the practice squad the next day, but was released two days later. On November 13, 2019, Dora was signed to the Cardinals practice squad. He was promoted to the active roster on December 18, 2019. He was waived on July 26, 2020.

Winnipeg Blue Bombers
Dora signed with the Winnipeg Blue Bombers of the CFL on January 15, 2021. He was placed on the suspended list on July 9, 2021.

References

External links
Louisiana Tech Bulldogs bio
Denver Broncos bio

Living people
1992 births
Louisiana Tech Bulldogs football players
American football defensive linemen
American football outside linebackers
People from West Point, Mississippi
Players of American football from Mississippi
Denver Broncos players
Arizona Cardinals players
Indianapolis Colts players
Winnipeg Blue Bombers players